Events from the year 1997 in the United Kingdom. This year is noted for a landslide general election victory for the Labour Party under Tony Blair; the transfer of Hong Kong, the largest remaining British colony, to China; and the death of Diana, Princess of Wales.

Incumbents
Monarch – Elizabeth II
Prime Minister 
John Major (Conservative) (until 2 May) 
Tony Blair (Labour) (starting 2 May)
Parliament
 51st (until 8 April)
 52nd (starting 7 May)

Events

January
 6 January – Allegations of a Conservative MP's extramarital affair appear in the News of the World newspaper a week after Conservative Prime Minister John Major put "the family" at the heart of his campaign. Jerry Hayes – married with two children – denies the allegations. 
 7 January – 2.5 million people take part in a phone-in vote as part of an ITV debate on the British monarchy. A 2-1 majority vote in favour of retaining the institution.    
 9 January – British yachtsman Tony Bullimore is rescued in the Southern Ocean five days after his boat capsized in freezing waters.
 15 January
 Diana, Princess of Wales, calls for an international ban on landmines.
 The strengthening economy is reflected in a national unemployment total of 1,884,700 for last December – the lowest level since January 1991.  The Conservative government who are mired in allegations of sleaze are still behind Labour in the opinion polls as the general election looms.
 16 January 
 The Conservative Party government loses its majority in the House of Commons after the death of Iain Mills, MP for Meriden.
 Chris Evans resigns from BBC Radio 1 after his request for a four-day week is refused. Since joining the station as a breakfast-time DJ in 1995 Evans had boosted audience numbers by 700,000. 
 17 January
 A jury at the Old Bailey rules that 86-year-old Szymon Serafinowicz is unfit to stand trial on charges of murdering Jews during The Holocaust.
 East 17 singer Brian Harvey is dismissed from the band after publicly commenting that the drug Ecstasy is safe.
 20 January – Death of Labour Party MP Martin Redmond ends the government's minority. On the same day, the party vows not to raise income tax if, as seems likely, it wins the forthcoming general election.
 30 January – An underground anti-road protest ended as the last protester known as "Swampy" (Daniel Hooper) emerged from the network of tunnels beneath the A30 extension site in Devon.

February
 4 February – Moors Murderer Myra Hindley is informed by Home Secretary Michael Howard that she will never be released from prison. Hindley, who has now been in prison for more than 30 years, was originally issued with a whole life tariff by the then Home Secretary David Waddington in 1990, but not informed of the ruling until just over two years ago. 
 6 February – The Court of Appeal rules that Mrs Diane Blood of Leeds can be inseminated with her dead husband's sperm. Mrs Blood had been challenging for the right to use the sperm of her husband Stephen since just after his death two years ago.
 12 February – A 23 year old British soldier is shot dead in Northern Ireland. Lance Bombardier Stephen Restorick was shot by a sniper while manning a checkpoint in Bessbrook (County Armagh); he is the last British soldier to be killed by the Provisional IRA.   
 14 February – The Daily Mail newspaper accuses five young men of the murder of Stephen Lawrence on its front page the day after a coroner's inquest found that the teenager had been unlawfully killed in an unprovoked racist attack by five white youths in April 1993.   
 15 February - Murder of 13 year old Billie Jo Jenkins in Hastings, East Sussex who was beaten to death at the family home. Her stepfather Siôn Jenkins was convicted of her murder in 1998 but subsequently acquitted at a second retrial in 2006.
 22 February – Scientists at the Roslin Institute announce the birth of a cloned sheep named Dolly seven months after the fact.
 27 February – The government loses its Commons majority again after a Labour victory at the Wirral South by-election.

March
 10 March – 160 vehicles are involved in a motorway pile up on the M42 motorway at Bromsgrove, Worcestershire. Three people are killed and 60 injured.
 17 March – John Major announces that the general election will be held on 1 May. Despite the opinion polls having shown a double-digit Labour lead continuously since late 1992, Major is hoping for a unique fifth successive term of Conservative government by pinning his hopes on a strong economy and low unemployment – no incoming government since before the First World War has inherited economic statistics as strong as the ones that Labour will should they win the election.
 18 March – The Sun newspaper, a traditional supporter of the Conservative Party, declares its support for Tony Blair and Labour, condemning the Conservatives as "tired, divided and rudderless" – a stark contrast to its support for them in the run-up to the 1992 election where it waged a high-profile campaign against the then Labour leader Neil Kinnock and, after the Conservative victory, claimed responsibility for the result.
 23 March – Unemployed continues to fall and now stands at just over 1,800,000 – its lowest level since December 1990.
 30 March – Channel 5, Britain's fifth terrestrial television channel and its first new one since the launch of Channel 4 in November 1982, is launched.
 31 March – BBC pre-school children's television series Teletubbies first airs.

April
 April – Nursery Education Voucher Scheme introduced, guaranteeing a government-funded contribution to the cost of preschool education for 4-year-olds.
 8 April
  BBC journalist Martin Bell announces that he is to stand as a candidate against Neil Hamilton in the Tatton constituency on an anti-corruption platform.
 A MORI opinion poll shows Conservative support at a four-year high of 34%, but Labour still look set to win next month's general election as they have a 15-point lead.
 29 April – The last MORI poll before the election tips Labour for a landslide victory as they gain 48% of the vote and a 20-point lead over the Conservatives.

May
 1 May – General election:
  The Labour Party under Tony Blair defeat the incumbent Conservative government under Prime Minister John Major in a landslide result, winning 418 seats.
  Several high-profile Conservative MPs, including seven Cabinet ministers lose their seats, as do all Conservative MPs in Scotland and Wales. Michael Portillo, who was tipped by many to be the next leader of the Conservatives, is among those who lose their seats.
 The Conservatives fail to make any gains.
 A record 120 women enter parliament, including 101 female Labour MPs.
 Mohammad Sarwar, elected for Labour in Glasgow Govan, becomes the first ever Muslim MP.
 2 May – Being the largest party holding a majority after the general election, Conservative John Major resigns and Tony Blair is appointed Prime Minister of the United Kingdom by The Queen.
 3 May – Katrina and the Waves win the Eurovision Song Contest with the song Love Shine a Light, the first time the UK has won the competition since 1981.
 6 May – New Chancellor of the Exchequer, Gordon Brown announces that the Bank of England, central bank of the UK, is to assume independent responsibility for UK monetary policy.
 19 May – The new Labour government announces that it will ban tobacco sponsorship of sporting events.

June
 June – Ford enters the growing compact coupe market with its Puma, which uses the same chassis as the Ka and Fiesta.
 2 June – The Halifax Building Society floats on the London Stock Exchange. Over 7.5 million customers of the Society become shareholders of the new bank, the largest extension of shareholders in UK history.
 12 June – Law Lords declare that former Home Secretary, Michael Howard, acted illegally in raising the minimum sentence of the two juveniles who committed the murder of James Bulger, Robert Thompson and Jon Venables, to 15 years. They also strip the government of setting minimum terms for prisoners aged under 18 who had received life or indefinite prison sentences.
 19 June
 The High Court of Justice delivers judgement, largely in favour of McDonald's, in the libel case of McDonald's Corporation v Steel & Morris ("the McLibel case"), the longest trial in English legal history, against two environmental campaigners.
 William Hague is elected as the leader of the Conservative Party.
23 June – Construction begins on the Millennium Dome.
 25 June – An auction of dresses owned by Diana, Princess of Wales, in Manhattan raises more than £2 million for charity.
 27 June – Publication of J. K. Rowling's first Harry Potter novel, Harry Potter and the Philosopher's Stone.

July
 1 July – The UK transfers sovereignty of Hong Kong, the largest remaining British colony, to the People's Republic of China as the 99 years lease on the territory formally ends. This event is widely considered by historians and commentators to mark the end of the British Empire, the largest imperial endeavour in the history of mankind.
 2 July – Chancellor Gordon Brown launches the first Labour budget for nearly 20 years, which includes a further £3billion for education and healthcare, as well as a £3.5billion scheme to get single mothers, under 25's and long term unemployed people back into work.
 4 July – Russian carmaker Lada announces the end of imports to the United Kingdom after 23 years and some 350,000 sales of its low-priced, low-specification cars, which at their peak sold more than 30,000 cars a year but managed just over 6,000 sales last year.
 6–11 July – 1997 nationalist riots in Northern Ireland: there is violence in nationalist areas after an Orange Order parade is allowed down the Garvaghy Road in Portadown by the Royal Ulster Constabulary as part of the Drumcree conflict.
 19 July – The IRA declares a ceasefire.
 30 July – Sunderland's Stadium of Light, the largest football club stadium to be built in England since the 1920s, is opened by the Duke of York.
 31 July
 Education (Schools) Act abolishes the Assisted Places Scheme (free or state-subsidised places for qualifying children attending fee-paying independent schools).
 At the Uxbridge by-election, John Randall holds the seat for the Conservatives.

August
 2 August – 
 John Major's Prime Minister's Resignation Honours are announced.
 The comedy film Bean is released in movie theaters.
 14 August – Derby County F.C. move into their new Pride Park stadium, but their inaugural match against Wimbledon in the FA Premier League is abandoned in the second half due to floodlight failure.
 21 August – The new Oasis album, Be Here Now, is released – selling a record of more than 350,000 copies on its first day.
 27 August –
 An international survey shows that British rail fares are the most expensive in the world and have risen by 12% since privatisation.
 Stoke City F.C. move into their new Britannia Stadium, which is officially opened by football legend Sir Stanley Matthews.
 31 August – Reports emerge in the early hours of the morning that Diana, Princess of Wales, has been injured in a car crash in Paris which has claimed the life of Dodi Fayed, the Harrods heir. Within four hours, it is confirmed that Diana has died in hospital as a result of her injuries. The United Kingdom and much of the rest of the world is plunged into widespread mourning.

September

 1 September
 French investigators reveal that Diana's driver, Henri Paul, was over the drink-driving limit and had been travelling at speeds in excess of 100 mph before the crash that killed her. Lawyers for Mohamed Al-Fayed, father of Dodi Al-Fayed, lay the blame on the paparazzi who were pursuing the vehicle.
 A new style of fifty pence coin is introduced.
 Reebok Stadium, the new home of Bolton Wanderers F.C., is opened by deputy Prime Minister John Prescott.
 2 September - 18 year old West Ham United footballer Rio Ferdinand is dropped from the England squad after being convicted of a drink-driving offence.
 5 September – The Queen makes a nationwide broadcast in tribute to Diana, Princess of Wales, following widespread criticism of the Royal Family's response to her death.
 6 September – The funeral of Diana, Princess of Wales takes place at Westminster Abbey, London followed by a private burial at the estate of the Earls Spencer in Althorp, Northamptonshire. The Earl Spencer, brother of Diana, attacks the Royal Family's and the media's treatment of Diana in his funeral eulogy. TV coverage of the funeral is hosted by both BBC 1 and ITV, attracting an audience of more than 32,000,000 which falls just short of the national TV audience record set by the England national football team's victorious World Cup final in 1966.
 7 September – Clyde Auditorium in Glasgow (the "armadillo"), designed by Foster and Partners, is completed.
 9 September - A 40-year-old woman from Bradford in West Yorkshire wins £14,000 damages after suing her ex-husband for rape in what was the first civil action of its kind in Britain.
 11 September – Referendum in Scotland on the creation of a national Parliament with devolved powers takes place. On two separate questions, voters back the plans both for a national Parliament and for it to have limited tax raising powers.
 12 September - Newspapers report that an operation carried out in February by neurosurgeon Steve Gill during which a woman's head was temporarily detached from her spine has been a success 
 13 September – Release of Elton John's Candle in the Wind remade as a tribute to Diana, Princess of Wales. This will be the second best-selling single worldwide of all time.
 14 September - Conservative Party leader William Hague receives criticism for accusing Prime Minister Tony Blair of exploiting the recent death of Diana, Princess of Wales for political advantage.
 15 September - The ITV detective drama series Prime Suspect which stars actress Helen Mirren wins the Emmy award in the US for best mini-series.
 16 September - A bomb explodes outside an RUC station in Markethill, County Armagh a day after the start of Northern Ireland peace talks. The IRA deny responsibility.
 17 September 
Police investigating the death of Diana, Princess of Wales reveal that the car in which she was travelling may have collided with a Fiat Uno seconds before hitting a concrete pillar.
 The Ulster Unionists (the largest loyalist party in Northern Ireland) agree to take part in peace talks that involve Sinn Féin. 
 18 September
 Welsh devolution referendum on the creation of a national Assembly takes place. Voters in Wales narrowly back the plans.
 Opening of Sensation exhibition of Young British Artists from the collection of Charles Saatchi at the Royal Academy in London. A portrait of Moors murderer Myra Hindley created from children's handprints by artist Marcus Harvey is removed from display after vandal attacks.
 19 September - Seven die and 139 are injured in the Southall rail crash when a Passenger train passes a Danger signal and collides with a Freight train.
 25 September 
A Saudi court sentences British nurse Lucille McLauchlan to eight years in prison and 500 lashes for being an accessory to the murder of Australian nurse Yvonne Gilford in December the previous year. Fellow British nurse Deborah Parry is charged with murder and could face the death penalty if found guilty. Ms Gilford's brother Frank, is reported to be willing to accept £750,000 in "blood money" for Ms Parry's life to be spared if she is found guilty. Foreign Secretary Robin Cook condemns the sentence of flogging against Ms McLauchlan as "wholly unacceptable in the modern world".
 RAF pilot Andy Green breaks the land speed record at Black Rock in the Nevada desert. His Thrust SSC jet car set an average speed of 714 MPH, 81 MPH faster than the previous record.
 29 September – British scientists state that they have found a link between Creutzfeldt–Jakob disease and eating of BSE-infected meat.

October
 1 October – The final LTI FX4 London cab is produced after 39 years.
 4 October – The BBC introduces its new corporate logo across the corporation, as well as new idents for BBC1.
 15 October – Andy Green driving the ThrustSSC sets a new land speed record of 763.035 mph (1227.99 km/h), the first time the sound barrier is broken on land.
 24 October – WPC Nina Mackay, 25, is stabbed to death in Stratford, London, when entering a flat to arrest a Somali asylum seeker who was due to be deported.

November
 4 November – BBC News launches a full-time online news service, having already created special websites for the 1995 budget as well as this year's general election and the death of Diana, Princess of Wales.
 6 November – Labour hold the Paisley South by-election despite a swing of 11.3% to the SNP.
 12 November – Brazil's Supreme Court refuses to extradite the Great Train Robber Ronnie Biggs to Britain.
 17 November – Six Britons are among the 58 people killed by terrorists in the Valley of the Kings, Egypt.
 20 November
 The Queen and The Duke of Edinburgh celebrate their 50th wedding anniversary.
 At the Winchester by-election, Mark Oaten holds the seat for the Liberal Democrats.
 24 November – The British Library opens its first public reading room at its new London site on the Euston Road.

December
 3 December – Andrew Evans, who was convicted of the 1972 murder of 14-year-old Judith Roberts in Tamworth, Staffordshire, has his conviction overturned by the Court of Appeal after the hearing is told he was being treated for depression when he confessed to the crime, and there is no other evidence against him.
 10 December – John E. Walker wins the Nobel Prize in Chemistry jointly with Paul D. Boyer "for their elucidation of the enzymatic mechanism underlying the synthesis of adenosine triphosphate (ATP)".
 11 December – The Royal Yacht Britannia is decommissioned after 44 years in service.
 18 December – The bill to establish the Scottish Parliament unveiled by Secretary of State for Scotland Donald Dewar.
 19 December
 William Hague marries Ffion Jenkins.
 Moors murderer Myra Hindley loses a High Court appeal against the whole life tariff which was imposed on her by Home Secretary David Waddington in 1990 and later confirmed by Waddington's successor Michael Howard.
 22 December
 The government announces an independent inquiry into the BSE crisis.
 Twelve people are arrested during protests by disabled people outside Downing Street.
23 December – Rover Group produces the final Rover 100 after 17 years.
 24 December – Will Straw, son of Cabinet minister Jack Straw, is arrested on suspicion of supplying cannabis.
 27 December – Ulster Loyalist leader Billy Wright is shot dead in the Maze Prison. Prisoners of the Irish National Liberation Army are believed to have been responsible for Wright's murder.
 31 December – Singer Elton John and football legend Tom Finney are among the men receiving knighthoods in the New Year's Honours List.

Undated
 The Weare prison ship is berthed in Portland Harbour as a temporary overflow facility.
 The WOW! Awards organization is founded.
 The Tenants' and Residents' Organisations of England organization is officially recognised.

Publications
 Iain Banks' novel A Song of Stone.
 Ted Hughes' poetry Tales from Ovid.
 Ian McEwan's novel Enduring Love.
 Terry Pratchett's Discworld novel Jingo.
 Philip Pullman's novel The Subtle Knife.
 J. K. Rowling's novel Harry Potter and the Philosopher's Stone.

Births

 3 January
Joe Morrell, footballer
Jordan Thompson, footballer
 7 January
 Izzy Brown, footballer 
 Kyle Stanger, actor
 8 January - Jack Simpson, footballer
 11 January – Demetri Mitchell, footballer
 23 January 
 Sophie Hahn, athlete
 Shaheen Jafargholi, actor and singer
 Giorgio Rasulo, footballer
 2 February
Ellie Bamber, actress
Cameron Borthwick-Jackson, footballer
Gabby George, footballer
 3 February – Lewis Cook, footballer
 5 February – Patrick Roberts, footballer
 8 February 
 Venus Angelic, singer and vlogger
 Dalton Smith, boxer
 Anton Walkes, footballer (died 2023)
 10 February 
Adam Armstrong, footballer
Lauren Mote, actress
 12 February - Connor Mahoney, footballer
 16 February – Charlie Green, singer
 17 February – Josef Craig, Paralympic swimmer
 18 February 
Bradley Collins, footballer
Jack Rowan, actor 
 21 February – Arwel Robson, rugby union player
 23 February – Luke Amos, footballer
 4 March – Freddie Woodman, footballer
 8 March – Kevin Nisbet, footballer
 12 March – Dean Henderson, footballer
 14 March – Brad Taylor, cricketer
 15 March – Jonjoe Kenny, footballer
 21 March – Nat Phillips, footballer
 22 March – Harry Wilson, footballer
 23 March – Aidan Davis, dancer
 24 March – George Thomas, footballer
 29 March – Leah Williamson, footballer
 1 April
 Asa Butterfield, actor
 Cian Harries, footballer
 Olivia Smart, ice dancer
 3 April – Mitchell Rao, cricketer
 7 April – Laura van der Heijden, cellist
 8 April – Keira Walsh, footballer
 11 April 
 Max Clegg, speedway racer
 Tully Kearney, swimmer
 13 April – Kyle Walker-Peters, footballer
 15 April – Maisie Williams, actress
 6 May – Duncan Scott, swimmer
 16 May – Cloe and Holly Mackie, actresses
 23 May – Joe Gomez, footballer
 25 May - Sophie Walsh, Kodak baby of the year, 1997
 11 June – Jorja Smith, singer
 12 June – Gabrielle Jupp, artistic gymnast
 19 June
Sheyi Ojo, footballer
Molly Windsor, actress
 28 June – Connor Edwards, rugby union player
 3 July – Mia McKenna-Bruce, actress
 7 July – Viddal Riley, boxer
 8 July
David Brooks, footballer
Lauran Hibberd, singer-songwriter
 13 July – Shayon Harrison, footballer
 18 July – Fionn Whitehead, actor
 4 August – Mollie Green, footballer
 5 August – Clara van Wel, singer-songwriter
 16 August – Tilly Keeper, actress
 24 August – Alan Walker, English-Norwegian music producer and DJ
 25 August – Holly Gibbs, actor
 29 August – Ainsley Maitland-Niles, footballer
 30 August – Dael Fry, footballer
 10 September – Paul Smyth, footballer
 14 September – Dominic Solanke, footballer
 16 September
Amy-Leigh Hickman, actress
Oscar Lloyd, actor
 22 September – Jake Clarke-Salter, footballer
 23 September
Callum Connolly, footballer
George Panayi, cricketer
 24 September – Tosin Adarabioyo, footballer
 28 September – Ben Green, cricketer
 1 October
Aimee Challenor, politician and transgender activist
Hamza Choudhury, footballer
 2 October – Tammy Abraham, footballer
 8 October – Ben White, footballer
 10 October – Kieran Dowell, footballer
 20 October – John Bell, Scottish actor
 22 October – Joe Rodon, footballer
 23 October
Tallulah Greive, Australian-born Scottish actress
Ezri Konsa, footballer
 24 October – Claudia Fragapane, gymnast
 26 October – Ryan Patel, cricketer
 27 October
Jessica Carter, footballer
Eden Taylor-Draper, actor
 30 October – Sean Longstaff, footballer
 31 October – Marcus Rashford, footballer
 5 November 
 Chris Mepham, footballer
 Greg Taylor, footballer
 6 November – Hero Fiennes-Tiffin, actor
 9 November – Matthew Fisher, cricketer
 10 November – Daniel James, footballer
 14 November – Axel Tuanzebe, footballer
 15 November
Catie Munnings, rally driver
Josh Tongue, cricketer
 17 November – James Whitley, paralympic skier 
 18 November – Ovie Ejaria, footballer
 3 December – Hayley Okines, activist
 5 December – Sophie Simnett, actress
 9 December – Harvey Barnes, footballer
 18 December – Max Holden, cricketer

Full date unknown 
 Michael-Joel David Stuart, actor

Deaths

 1 January 
 Graham Kersey, cricketer (born 1971); died in a car crash
 Joan Rice, actress (born 1930)
 5 January – V. C. Wynne-Edwards, zoologist (born 1906)
 10 January
 Elspeth Huxley, author, journalist, broadcaster and government advisor (born 1907) 
 Alexander R. Todd, Baron Todd, Scottish biochemist (born 1907)
 16 January 
 Iain Mills, Member of Parliament (born 1940)
 Martin Redmond, Member of Parliament (born 1937)
 18 January – Myfanwy Piper, art critic, opera librettist, and wife of John Piper (born 1911)
 20 January – Dennis Main Wilson, broadcast producer (born 1924)
 27 January – Cecil Arthur Lewis, author and last surviving air ace of World War I (born 1898)
 28 January – Geoffrey Rippon, Baron Rippon of Hexham, politician (born 1924)
 2 February – Godfrey Baseley, radio executive, creator of The Archers (born 1904)
 9 February 
 Brian Connolly, Scottish singer-songwriter (born 1945)
 Barry Evans, actor (born 1943)
 17 February – Kenny Graham, jazz saxophonist and composer (born 1924)
 23 February – Frank Launder, film director and producer (born 1906)
 25 February – Arthur Hewlett, actor (born 1907)
 6 March – Ursula Torday, novelist (born 1912)
 9 March 
 Terry Nation, Welsh screenwriter (born 1930)
 Dame Veronica Wedgwood, historian (born 1910)
 13 March – Ronald Fraser, actor (born 1930)
 16 March – John Montague Stow, colonial official (born 1911)
 21 March – Rev. W. V. Awdry, children's writer (born 1911)
 29 March
 George William Gregory Bird, physician (born 1916)
 Norman Pirie, biochemist (born 1907)
 1 April – Norman Carr, English environmentalist and author (born 1912)
 22 April
 Reg Gammon, English painter and illustrator (born 1894)
 Nancy Seear, Baroness Seear, English politician (born 1913)
 23 April – Denis Compton, footballer and cricketer (born 1918)
 25 April – Dudley Pope, author (born 1925)
 27 April – Peter Winch, philosopher (born 1926)
 29 April – Isabel Graham Bryce, public servant (born 1902)
 6 May – John Edwards Hill, mammologist (born 1928)
 8 May 
 Pat Hughes, tennis player (born 1902)
 Michael Shersby, Member of Parliament (born 1933)
 13 May – Laurie Lee, poet and author (born 1914)
 2 June – Eddie Thomas, Welsh boxer (born 1925)
 19 June – Julia Smith, television producer (born 1927)
 30 June – Dame Sylvia Crowe, landscape architect (born 1901)
 4 July – John Zachary Young, biologist (born 1907)
 7 July – Royston Tickner, English actor (born 1922)
 10 July – Ivor Allchurch, former footballer (born 1929)
 15 July – Rosamund Greenwood, actress (born 1907)
 18 July – Sir James Goldsmith, financier and politician, founder of the Referendum Party (born 1933)
 19 July – Frank Farrell, rock bassist (born 1947) 
 24 July – Brian Glover, actor (born 1934)
 28 July – Rosalie Crutchley, actress (born 1920)
 29 July – Jack Archer, former sprinter (born 1921)
 13 August – Marjorie Lynette Sigley, artist, writer, actress, choreographer and theatre director (born 1928)
 18 August – Don Knight, actor (born 1933)
 23 August – John Kendrew, molecular biologist, recipient of the Nobel Prize in Chemistry (born 1917)
 24 August – Louis Essen, physicist (born 1908)
 31 August
 Dodi Fayed, Egyptian film producer and heir to Harrods department store (born 1955); died in Paris car crash
 Diana, Princess of Wales (born 1961); died in hospital after being seriously injured in the same crash
 4 September 
 Jeffrey Bernard, journalist (born 1932)
 Belle Stewart, Scottish singer (born 1906)
 6 September – P. H. Newby, novelist (born 1918)
 8 September – Derek Taylor, journalist and record producer (born 1932)
 17 September – Brian Hall, actor (born 1937)
 19 September – Jack May, actor (born 1922)
 28 September – David Gill, film historian (born 1928)
 3 October – A. L. Rowse, historian (born 1903)
 5 October 
 Andrew Keir, Scottish actor (born 1926)
 Debbie Linden, glamour model and actress (born 1961); heroin overdose
 6 October – Adrienne Hill, actress (born 1937)
 13 October – Richard Mason, British novelist (b. 1919)
 15 October – Macdonald Critchley, neurologist (born 1900)
 19 October 
 Harold French, actor, film director and screenwriter (born 1897)
 Arthur Ibbetson, cinematographer (born 1922)
 5 November – Sir Isaiah Berlin, philosopher and sociologist (born 1909, Russian Empire)
 6 November
 Annie Llewelyn-Davies, Baroness Llewelyn-Davies of Hastoe, politician (born 1915) 
 Epic Soundtracks, musician (born 1959)
 17 November – Wilfred Josephs, composer (born 1927)
 18 November – Joyce Wethered, Lady Heathcoat-Amory, golfer (born 1901)
 21 November – Jack Purvis, actor (born 1937)
 2 December – Shirley Crabtree, "Big Daddy", wrestler (born 1930)
 4 December – Richard Vernon, actor (born 1925)
 7 December – Billy Bremner, footballer and football manager (born 1942)
 11 December – Eddie Chapman, World War II spy (born 1914)
 13 December – Alexander Oppenheim, mathematician (born 1903)
 14 December 
 Owen Barfield, author, poet, philosopher and critic (born 1898)
 Gerald Legge, 9th Earl of Dartmouth, peer (born 1924)
 17 December – Peter Taylor, film editor (born 1922)
 27 December – Billy Wright, Northern Irish loyalist leader (born 1960); murdered in prison
 28 December – James Lees-Milne, writer and architectural historian (born 1908)

See also
 List of British films of 1997

References

 
Years of the 20th century in the United Kingdom
United Kingdom